Castle Bottom to Yateley and Hawley Commons is a  biological Site of Special Scientific Interest north of Fleet in Hampshire.

This site of heathland and conifer plantation has an internationally important population of Dartford warbler and populations of two other protected birds, woodlark and nightjar. It also has an outstanding assemblage of dragonflies and damselflies, with 19 out of the 37 British species. Other invertebrates include the nationally rare conopid fly, Myopa fasciata.

References

 
Sites of Special Scientific Interest in Hampshire